Milton M. DeLano (December 17, 1827 – June 24, 1894) was an American politician.  He served as mayor of Denver, Colorado from 1866 to 1868. He was born in Allegany County, New York.

References

Further reading

Mayors of Denver
1827 births
1894 deaths
19th-century American politicians
People from Allegany County, New York